Helional may refer to:

 A brand of the pharmaceutical drug phenobarbital
 A name of the fragrance chemical ocean propanal